Chè trôi nước (or sometimes is called Chè xôi nước in Southern Vietnam or Bánh chay in Northern Vietnam, both meaning "floating dessert wading in water") is a Vietnamese dessert made of glutinous rice filled with mung bean paste bathed in a sweet clear or brown syrup made of water, sugar, and grated ginger root. It is generally warmed before eating and garnished with sesame seeds and coconut milk. It is often served during Lunar New Year or more recently, served in the Cold-Eating Festival (March 3 in the Vietnamese calendar).

Two northern Vietnamese desserts, bánh trôi (also called bánh trôi nước) and bánh chay, are similar to chè trôi nước (description of it stated above). Chè trôi nước is also similar to a Chinese dish called tangyuan.

See also
 Chè
 Gulab jamun
 List of desserts
 Mochi
 Tangyuan

References

External links
Chè trôi nước photo
Chè trôi nước photo

Vietnamese desserts